There were four tennis events at the 2010 South American Games. The events were held over March 19–24.

Medal table

Medalists

 
Tennis
2010 in tennis
2010